Andres Ambühl (born 14 September 1983) is a Swiss professional ice hockey forward who currently serves as captain of HC Davos of the National League (NL). He has won 6 Swiss NL championships, and 2 Spengler Cups with HC Davos and a silver medal with Switzerland at the 2013 World Championship. Ambühl also represented Switzerland at the 2006, 2010, 2014,
2018 and 2022 Winter Olympics. Ambühl is the world record holder for most World Championship tournaments played by a player, with 17 tournaments.

Playing career
Ambühl began playing junior hockey in the HC Davos organization with the club's junior team. In 2000–01, he scored 41 points in 31 games as a junior and debuted in three games with Davos in the NLA. He joined the senior team in 2001–02, scoring eight points in 38 games during his rookie season. Playing with Davos in the 2006 Spengler Cup as tournament hosts, Ambühl scored the championship-winning goal against Team Canada in a 3–2 final win.  In 2007–08, Ambühl scored a career-high 26 points in 49 games for HC Davos.

Having previously played nine seasons for Davos, Ambühl signed a contract with the New York Rangers on 27 May 2009. He was then assigned to the Rangers affiliate, the Hartford Wolf Pack of the American Hockey League for the duration of the 2009–10 season.

On 17 April 2010, Andres returned to the Swiss NLA, signing with the ZSC Lions. In 2012 he was part of ZSC's Swiss NLA championship winning team. After three seasons with the ZSC Lions, Andres Ambühl returned to his home team HC Davos for the 2013–14 season.

On January 28, 2016, Ambühl signed a 3-year contract extension with HC Davos worth CHF 3 million. On December 17, 2018, Ambühl agreed to an early two-year contract extension with HC Davos through the 2020–21 season.

On January 18, 2021, Ambühl was signed to an early two-year contract extension by HC Davos through the 2022–23 season.

Career statistics

Regular season and playoffs

International

References

External links

1983 births
Living people
Hartford Wolf Pack players
HC Davos players
Ice hockey players at the 2006 Winter Olympics
Ice hockey players at the 2010 Winter Olympics
Ice hockey players at the 2014 Winter Olympics
Ice hockey players at the 2022 Winter Olympics
Olympic ice hockey players of Switzerland
People from Davos
Swiss ice hockey right wingers
ZSC Lions players
Ice hockey players at the 2018 Winter Olympics
Sportspeople from Graubünden